Bangladesh competed at the 2014 Summer Youth Olympics, in Nanjing, China from 16 August to 28 August 2014.

Archery

Bangladesh was given a quota to compete by the tripartite committee.

Individual

Team

Field Hockey

Bangladesh qualified a boys' team based on its performance at the 2013 Under 16 Asian Cup.

Boys' Tournament

Roster

 Mohammad Raju Ahmmed
 Rezaul Babu
 Mohamed Deen Emon
 Mohammad Ashraful Islam
 Mohammad Fazla Rabby
 Sajibure Rahman
 Khaled Rakin
 Mohammad Sarkar
 Mohamed Uddin

Group Stage

Placement 9-10

Shooting

Bangladesh was given a quota to compete by the tripartite committee.

Individual

Team

Swimming

Bangladesh qualified one swimmer.

Boys

Weightlifting

Bangladesh was given a quota to compete in a girls' event by the tripartite committee.

Girls

References

2014 in Bangladeshi sport
Nations at the 2014 Summer Youth Olympics
Bangladesh at the Youth Olympics